Black Patriots were African Americans who sided with the colonists who opposed British rule during the American Revolution. The term "Black Patriots" includes, but is not limited to, the 5,000 or more African Americans who served in the Continental Army and Patriot militias during the American Revolutionary War.

Their counterparts on the pro-British side were known as Black Loyalists, African Americans who sided with the British during the American revolution. Thousands of American slaves escaped to British lines to take up their offers of freedom in exchange for military service as per Dunmore's Proclamation and the Philipsburg Proclamation.

First Patriot martyr

Crispus Attucks is considered to be the first Black Patriot because he was killed in the Boston Massacre. Attucks was commemorated by his fellow Bostonians as a martyr for freedom. Attucks was a whaler who was believed to be of mixed Native American and African ancestry, born in or around Framingham, Massachusetts. His death in the Boston Massacre is considered to be the first Patriot fatality of the war.

Black Patriots who served in the State Militias
The Bucks of America were an all-Black, Massachusetts Militia company organized in 1775 in Boston. This was the name given to one of two all-black units fighting for independence. There is little known of the campaign history of the Bucks company, or if they ever saw combat. It appears that they operated mainly around Boston. The Bucks of America may have acted primarily as an auxiliary police or security service, in the city, during the war. They most likely did not see action against British forces.

Black Patriots who served in the Continental Army
After the British started enticing African Americans to serve or assist their cause in exchange for emancipation, Patriot leaders began to recruit free people of color in New England and other East Coast regions to serve in the Continental Army. They were promised a life of relative luxury and social mobility if they joined the war. Slaves in the American North were trying to escape the harsh treatment of the enslaved under American slavery. By joining the war, they believed they would be bettering their lives. Most of the time, Black Patriot soldiers served as individuals in a variety of predominantly white units of the Continental Army.

The 1st Rhode Island Regiment, also known as "Varnum's Continentals", was a Continental Army regiment from Rhode Island. It became well known as the "Black Regiment" because, for a time, it had several companies of African-American soldiers.  It is regarded as the first African-American military regiment, although its ranks were not exclusively African American.

Captain David Humphreys' All Black, 2nd Company, of the Connecticut Continental Line, served from October 1780-November 1782.  On November 27, 1780, Humphrey's Black Company was assigned to the 3rd Connecticut Regiment. On January 1, 1781, the Regiment was merged with the 4th Connecticut Regiment, re-organized into nine companies, and re-designated as the 1st Connecticut Regiment.

William "Billy" Lee was an enslaved valet of George Washington who served in the Continental Army and fought with the general's forces. Lee was considered to be Washington's favorite slave, and was often featured in the background of the general's portraits.

Descendants
Famed African American, Harvard scholar and professor Henry Louis Gates is descended from John Redman, a Free Black Man who served in the Continental Army. Gates is currently working on a project to find all descendants of Black Patriots, who served in the American Revolutionary Continental Army.

Proposed national memorial

The National Liberty Monument is a proposed national memorial to be located in the capital to honor the more than 5000 enslaved and free persons of African descent who served as soldiers or sailors, or provided civilian assistance during the American Revolutionary War. The memorial is an outgrowth of a failed effort to erect a Black Revolutionary War Patriots Memorial. This was authorized in 1986, but fundraising faltered and the memorial foundation dissolved in 2005.

Congress authorized the National Liberty Monument in January 2013. On September 8, 2014, the United States House of Representatives passed the joint resolution approving the location in the capital of a memorial to commemorate the more than 5,000 slaves and free Black people who fought for independence in the American Revolution. The joint resolution would approve the location of a commemorative work to honor the more than 5000 slaves and free black persons who fought in the American Revolution.

Notable Black Patriots
 

 Prince Hall
 Toby Gilmore
 Alexander Ames
 Crispus Attucks
 Charles Bowles
 Jeffrey Brace
 Joseph Brown
 Seymour Burr
 Wentworth Cheswell
 Titus Coburn
 Joseph Louis Cook
 Grant Cooper
 Oliver Cromwell
 Paul Cuffee
 Austin Dabney
 James Armistead Lafayette
 Caesar Dickenson
 Charlestown Eaads
 James Easton
 Prince Estabrook
 William Flora
 Asaba Grosvenor
 Blaney Grusha
 Jude Hall 
 Primus Hall
 Cuff Haynes
 Lemuel Haynes
 Henry Hill
 Cato Howe
 Agrippa Hull
 Jeremy Jonah
 Lambert Latham
 Cato Mead
 Jack Little
 Barzillai Lew
 Salem Poor
 James Robinson
 Silas Royal
 Peter Salem
 Prince Simbo
 Phillis Wheatley
 Prince Whipple
 Bosson Wright

See also 

 African Americans in the Revolutionary War

Bibliography
 Guthrie, James M. Camp-fires of the Afro-American; Or, The Colored Man as a Patriot, Soldier, Sailor, and Hero, in the Cause of Free America, 1899
 Moore, George Henry.  Historical notes on the employment of Negroes in the American Army of the Revolution, 1862 
 Nell, William Cooper.  The Colored Patriots of the American Revolution, With Sketches of Several Distinguished Colored Persons: To Which Is Added a Brief Survey of the Condition And Prospects of Colored Americans.  Boston:  Robert F. Wallcut, 1855.
 Wilson, Joseph Thomas. The Black Phalanx: A History of the Negro Soldiers of the United States in the Wars of 1775-1812, 1861-'65, 1890

References

External links
Black Patriots: Heroes of the Revolution

Pre-emancipation African-American history
African Americans in the American Revolution
Black Patriots